Danny Pena (born June 17, 1968, in Inglewood, California) is a retired U.S. soccer defensive midfielder.  He spent most of his career, both indoors and outdoors, with teams in the western U.S.

Player

Youth
Pena grew up in Southern California, playing for the Fram-Culver soccer club.  In 1986, he, and teammate Marcelo Balboa, took Fram-Culver all the way to the U-19 McGuire Cup title.  The next year, he played all three games at the 1987 FIFA World Youth Championship.

Professional
After high school, he chose to forgo college and signed with the Los Angeles Heat of the Western Soccer Alliance (WSA) in 1988.  He remained with the Heat through the 1990 season which the Heat played in the American Professional Soccer League (APSL). In 1991, the Blackhawks won the league title, defeating the Albany Capitals as Pena was selected as a first team All Star.  The next season, the Blackhawks lost to the Tampa Bay Rowdies in the semifinals.  However, Pena again was selected as a first team All Star.  When the Blackhawks owner withdrew the team from the APSL and moved them down a division to the USISL, Pena left the team and joined the Los Angeles Salsa of the APSL.  He remained with the Salsa for two seasons, 1993 and 1994.  In both seasons, he continued his streak of being selected to the All Star team.  In 1993, the Salsa lost the title game to the Colorado Foxes.  He began his indoor career with the Wichita Wings of Major Indoor Soccer League (MISL) with the 1991–1992 season.  In 1994, he joined the Dayton Dynamo of the 1994-1995 National Professional Soccer League (NPSL) season. His brother, Carlos, was the goalkeeper for Dayton. In 1995, he moved to the Sacramento Knights of the Continental Indoor Soccer League (CISL).  That season he was a CISL first team All Star and the CISL Defender of the Year as the Knights lost to the Monterrey La Raza.  Major League Soccer (MLS) signed Pena to a contract in 1996, but then loaned him to the Cincinnati Silverbacks of the National Professional Soccer League (NPSL) in November 1996. The Los Angeles Galaxy of MLS selected Pena in the 1997 MLS Supplemental Draft.  He spent the 1997 season in Los Angeles, but the Galaxy failed to protect him in the 1997 MLS Expansion Draft and the Chicago Fire selected him with their first pick.  However, he expressed his dissatisfaction with this development and on January 27, 1998, the Galaxy traded Chris Armas and Jorge Campos to the Fire for Pena and Kevin Hartman.  Pena suffered a season ending knee injury in June 2000.  While he returned for the 2001 season, the Galaxy sent Pena to the Tampa Bay Mutiny on July 30, 2001, for a conditional pick in the 2002 draft.  He saw time in six games, then was released at the end of the season.

National team
In 1997, the USMNT called up Pena, but he declined the invitation.

Managerial career
Pena now coaches boys soccer in Torrance, California.  He is also on staff with the Beach Soccer Club. He won nationals with his boys team. He has a silver elite girls team at Beach Soccer Club. He also has a boys team who won Cal South State Cup and were invited to Dallas Cup.

References

External links
 Career overview from St. Petersburg Times
 Force Soccer bio
 MISL stats

1976 births
Living people
American soccer players
American Professional Soccer League players
Cincinnati Silverbacks players
Continental Indoor Soccer League players
Dayton Dynamo players
LA Galaxy players
Los Angeles Heat players
Los Angeles Salsa players
Major Indoor Soccer League (1978–1992) players
Major League Soccer players
Monterrey La Raza players
National Professional Soccer League (1984–2001) players
Sportspeople from Inglewood, California
Sacramento Knights players
San Francisco Bay Blackhawks players
Tampa Bay Mutiny players
Western Soccer Alliance players
Wichita Wings (MISL) players
United States men's under-20 international soccer players
LA Galaxy draft picks
Association football midfielders